This is a list of butterflies of Vanuatu.

Hesperiidae

Coeliadinae
Badamia exclamationis (Fabricius, 1775)
Badamia atrox flava Evans, 1934
Hasora chromus bilunata (Butler, 1883)

Hesperiinae
Borbo cinnara (Wallace & Moore, 1866)
Pelopidas lyelli mathewi (Evans, 1937)

Papilionidae

Papilioninae
Papilio fuscus nomus Gabriel, 1936
Papilio fuscus hypsicles (Hewitson, 1868)
Papilio fuscus burgessi (Samson, 1982)

Pieridae

Coliadinae
Catopsilia pomona (Fabricius, 1775)
Catopsilia pyranthe lactea (Butler, 1870)
Catopsilia scylla gorgophone (Boisduval, 1836)
Eurema hecabe sulphurata (Butler, 1875)

Pierinae
Appias athama athama (Blanchard, 1848)
Appias paulina ega (Boisduval, 1836)
Cepora perimale jeanneli Viette, 1950
Pieris rapae (Linnaeus, 1758)
Belenois java peristhene (Boisduval, 1859)
Delias nysa santo Talbot, 1937

Lycaenidae

Theclinae
Deudorix mathewi mathewi Druce, 1892
Deudorix mathewi naruai Tennent, 2003

Polyommatinae
Petrelaea tombugensis (Röber, 1886)
Nacaduba novaehebridensis nubilus Tennent, 2003
Nacaduba novaehebridensis novaehebridensis Druce, 1892
Nacaduba dyopa lepidus (Tennent, 2000)
Nacaduba kurava euretes (Druce, 1891)
Nacaduba biocellata armillata (Butler, 1875)
Nacaduba mallicollo mallicollo Druce, 1892
Nacaduba samsoni Tennent, 2001
Prosotas patricae Tennent, 2003
Catopyrops nebulosa nebulosa (Druce, 1892)
Catopyrops nebulosa opacus Tennent, 2003
Jamides goodenovii (Butler, 1876)
Jamides pulcherrima Butler, 1884
Jamides kava Druce, 1892
Jamides morphoides Butler, 1884
Jamides carissima carissima (Butler, 1875)
Jamides celeno evanescens (Butler, 1875)
Jamides celeno niger Tennent, 2003
Catochrysops panormus caerulea Tite, 1959
Catochrysops taitensis taitensis (Boisduval, 1832)
Lampides boeticus (Linnaeus, 1767)
Famegana alsulus alsulus (Herrich-Schaeffer, 1869)
Leptotes plinius pseudocassius (Murray, 1873)
Zizina labradus caduca (Butler, 1875)
Zizula hylax dampierensis (Rothschild, 1915)
Everes lacturnus palliensis (Ribbe, 1899)
Euchrysops cnejus cnidus Waterhouse and Lyell, 1914
Luthrodes cleotas excellens (Butler, 1875)

Nymphalidae

Danainae
Parantica pumila samsoni Ackery, Taylor & Renevier, 1989
Parantica pumila hebridesia (Butler, 1875)
Tirumala hamata moderata (Butler, 1875)
Danaus affinis atchinii Tennent, 2003
Danaus petilia (Stoll, 1790)
Danaus plexippus plexippus (Linnaeus, 1758)
Euploea sylvester tristis (Butler, 1866)
Euploea leucostictos iphianassa (Butler, 1866)
Euploea leucostictos novarumebudum (Carpenter, 1942)
Euploea tulliolus forsteri (C & R Felder, 1865)
Euploea boisduvalii torvina (Butler, 1875)
Euploea boisduvalii bakeri (Poulton, 1927)
Euploea lewinii lilybaea (Fruhstorfer, 1911)
Euploea treitschkei jessica (Butler, 1869)

Satyrinae
Mycalesis perseus lugens (Butler, 1875)
Orsotriaena medus mutata (Butler, 1875)
Melanitis leda solandra (Fabricius, 1775)
Melanitis amabilis amabilis (Boisduval, 1832)

Charaxinae
Polyura sacco santoensis Lachlan, 1993
Polyura sacco sacco Smart, 1977

Limenitidinae
Parthenos sylvia thesaurinus Grose Smith, 1897

Nymphalinae
Doleschallia browni herrichii (Butler 1875)
Hypolimnas antilope shortlandica (Ribbe, 1898)
Hypolimnas pithoeka impostor Tennent, 2002
Hypolimnas octocula octocula (Butler, 1869)
Hypolimnas octocula perryi (Butler, 1875)
Hypolimnas octocula tanna Samson, 1986
Hypolimnas octocula futunaensis Samson, 1986
Hypolimnas octocula bellus Tennent, 2003
Hypolimnas bolina nerina (Fabricius, 1775)
Hypolimnas misippus (Linnaeus, 1764)
Yoma sabina sabina (Cramer, [1780])
Junonia villida villida (Fabricius, 1787)

Heliconiinae
Vagrans egista hebridina (Waterhouse, 1920)
Vagrans egista samsoni Tennent, 2003

Acraeinae
Acraea andromacha andromacha (Fabricius, 1775)

References
W.John Tennent: A checklist of the butterflies of Melanesia, Micronesia, Polynesia and some adjacent areas. Zootaxa 1178: 1-209 (21 Apr. 2006)
Gross, G.F. (1975). The land invertebrates of the New Hebrides and their relationships.Philosophical Transactions of the Royal Society. Series B 272: 391-421.

Butterflies
Vanuatu
Vanuatu
Vanuatu
Butterflies